Hermes Airlines was a Greek charter airline headquartered in Alimos. It operated charter flights around Europe and the Mediterranean using its own brand name as well as on behalf of other airlines.

History
The airline was originally established as a subsidiary of Air Méditerranée. In February 2016 Air Méditerranée went into liquidation and closed, although Hermes Airlines confirmed they were unaffected by the decision and would continue operations; however, the airline would itself shut down as well during the same month.

Fleet

As of February 2016, the Hermes Airlines fleet consists of the following aircraft:

References

External links

Defunct airlines of Greece
Airlines established in 2011
Airlines disestablished in 2016
2016 disestablishments in Greece
Greek companies established in 2011